Lluís Solà i Sala (born Vic, Catalonia, 1940) is a Catalan poet, playwright and translator.

As a dramaturge, Lluís Solà has staged works by Strindberg, Aeschylus and Joan Brossa among other authors, and he has also presented his own works. He has stage-directed five of his own plays, and he has directed more than fifty classic and contemporary works, including the play nô Semimaru with scenery by Antoni Tàpies and music by Josep Mestres Quadreny. He has also directed productions from poets such J. V.Foix, Joan Vinyoli and Miquel Bauçà. He founded and directed the Centre Dramàtic d'Osona (Dramatic Center of Osona, Catalonia) and he was a professor at the Institut del Teatre (Theatre Institute) between 1975 and 2005. He was director of the theatrical group La Gàbia de Vic from 1963 to 1979. He has translated foreign authors such Kafka, Rilke, Rimbaud and Pessoa.

He was honoured in the Marxa dels Vigatans in September 2012.

Published work

Poetry 
Laves, escumes. Barcelona: Lumen, 1975
L'herba dels ulls. Barcelona: Eumo - Cafè Central, 1993
De veu en veu : obra poètica I (1960-1999). Barcelona: Proa, 2001 (Winning book of Premi de la Crítica - Poesia Catalana, 2001)
L'arbre constant: obra poètica II (1994-2000). Barcelona: Proa, 2003
Entre bellesa i dolor : Obra poètica inèdita. Barcelona: Ed. 62, 2010
Al llindar de l'ara. Palma de Mallorca: Moll, 2010
Estudis literaris 
La paraula i el món : assaigs sobre poesia. Barcelona: L'Avenç, 2013

Translations

From English to Catalan 
BECKETT, Samuel. Fi de partida. Released by La Gàbia de Vic, 1979. Barcelona: Diputació Provincial de Barcelona; Institut d'Edicions, 1990.
GOLDMANN, Lucien,El mètode estructuralista genèric en història de la literatura. Inquietud artística, 36 (1966).
POUND, Ezra. Retrospecció. Reduccions, 54 (1992).

From German to Catalan 
DÜRRENMATT, Friedrich. Grec busca grega. Barcelona: Edicions 62, 1966.
KAFKA, Franz. El castell. Barcelona: Ayma, 1971. 
HANDKE, Peter. La cavalcada sobre el llac de Constança. Released by La Gàbia de Vic, 1980. Barcelona: Edicions del Mall, 1984. 
PAPPENHEIM, Fritz. L’alienació de l’home modern. Barcelona: Novaterra, 1968. [essay]

From Ancient Greek to Catalan 
SOFOKLES. Antígona. Verse translation. Released by La Gàbia de Vic, 1963. Unpublished

From Japanese to Catalan 
ZEAMI. Semimaru. (Indirect translation from French). Premiered at the Aliança del Poble Nou, 1966. Unpublished.

From Swedish to Catalan 
STRINDBERG, August. El guant negre. Estrenada al Teatre Romea sota la direcció d’Hermann Bonnin, 1981. Unpublished.

References

External links 
 Lluís Solà at Memoro.org

Catalan-language writers
People from Vic
Writers from Catalonia
20th-century dramatists and playwrights
1940 births
Living people